Yobi may refer to the following:

 Yobi (binary prefix), an ISO/IEC standard binary unit prefix.
 Yobi, the Five Tailed Fox
 The main character of the educational game Yobi's Basic Spelling Tricks.